Events in the year 1868 in India.

Incumbents
Sir John Lawrence, Viceroy

Events
 Tata Group is founded By Jamsethji Tata.

Law
Indian Railway Companies Act (British statute)
Documentary Evidence Act (British statute)
Indian Prize Money Act (British statute)

Births
 Ardeshir Godrej, an 1868 Indian businessman, (died 1936).

Death
 18 February – Acharya Maharajshree Ayodhyaprasad Pande, Acharya of Swaminarayan Sampraday (born 1809).

References

 
India
Years of the 19th century in India